Tal-y-llyn is the name of a former township on the island of Anglesey, north-west Wales. This would suggest a total population for the community of 110 individuals. However, the population declined in the fourteenth century, the period of the Black Death. St Mary, Tal-y-llyn, the chapel of ease that used to serve the community, remains. The oldest parts of the church date from the twelfth century. St Mary's, which is a Grade I listed building – the highest grade of listing, designating buildings of "exceptional, usually national, interest" – has been in the care of the Friends of Friendless Churches since 1999.

Notable people 
 Elen Gwdman (fl. 1609) a Welsh female poet, a rare example of a female poet of the early modern period.

References

Former populated places in Wales
Villages in Anglesey
Aberffraw